Anne Elgård Rimmen (born 11 September 1981 in Denmark) is a presenter and former sports anchor for NRK Sport. She was born in Denmark, but moved to Norway as a three-year-old. She is the domestic partner of Ailo Gaup, and together they have a son and a daughter.

Rimmen studied journalism at University of Queensland in Brisbane, Australia. She started her TV career as a video journalist, program manager and editor in Tel Telemark's editorial in Skien. After this, Rimmen worked for the magazine RED and in TVNorge s sports editorial. After joining NRK in September 2007, she was primarily affiliated with NRK Sport, where she was, among other things, the presenter for OL-studio at 2012 Summer Olympics studio from London in addition to being a sports anchor in Dagsrevyen and other news programs on NRK. In the spring of 2011 she was co-hosted the Melodi Grand Prix broadcast together with Per Sundnes.

In 2014 she was the presenter for the NRK program Monsen på villspor.

Anne Rimmen is the sister of TV-personalities Morten Stokstad and Marte Stokstad.

References 

1981 births
Living people
NRK people
Norwegian television presenters
Norwegian women television presenters
TVNorge people
Norwegian expatriates in Denmark
Norwegian expatriates in Australia